Trachyphrynium is a monotypic genus of plants native to tropical Africa. The only recognized species is Trachyphrynium braunianum (K.Schum.) Baker, widespread from Liberia to Uganda.

References 

Marantaceae
Monotypic Zingiberales genera
Flora of Liberia
Flora of Uganda
Flora of Sudan
Flora of Ghana
Flora of Nigeria
Flora of Cameroon
Flora of Sierra Leone
Taxa named by Karl Moritz Schumann
Taxa named by John Gilbert Baker